Ljubiša Jokić (born 24 September 1958) is the former Chief of the General Staff of the Armed Forces of Serbia and Montenegro.

Early life 
He completed Air Force High School in Mostar, Bosnia and Herzegovina, and graduated from the Air Force Military Academy's pilot training program in Pula, Croatia. He continued his education at the General Staff Academy, graduating in 1995. During this time he received the title of Flying Instructor and was awarded the Gold Flight Medal.

Career 
He worked as a flying instructor until 1989 when he was appointed as Commander of a basic flight unit. In 1994, he was appointed Squadron Commander. He ended flight duties in 1997, becoming Chief of air-traffic-control at Podgorica airport. He returned to a military role from 1999 to 2003, first as Air Brigade Commander in 1999 and then Military Airport Air Base Commander in 2002.

In 2003, he was appointed Head of Military Cabinet of the President of and, at the same time, as Defense Supreme Counsel Secretary. At the end of 2004, he aided in the transformation of the Army in and was named Deputy of Minister of Defense for Human Resources. The top of his military career came as Head of the General Staff of Serbia and Montenegro   where he served from September 2005 to June 2006.

From July 2007 to December 2011 he was Montenegro military representative to the NATO and EU military committees.

In March 2012 he was appointed Senior Military Adviser to the Permanent Mission of Montenegro at OSCE and Military Attaché in Austria, Czech Republic and Slovakia.

In August 2016 he was appointed as Senior Military Adviser MOD.

From January 2017 to October 2017 he was appointed Head of General Staff of Montenegro.

References

|-

1958 births
Living people
People from Plav, Montenegro
Chief of staff of the Military of Serbia and Montenegro
Montenegrin generals
Air force personnel